The Saint Louis Exposition or St. Louis Expo was a series of annual agricultural and technical fairs held in St. Louis' Fairgrounds Park, from the 1850s to 1902.  In 1904, the Louisiana Purchase Exposition, a major  World's Fair, was held in St. Louis, Missouri.  The annual agricultural/technical exposition was not held in 1903-4, and ceased after the World's Fair. Memorabilia from the annual St. Louis Expositions are sometimes confused with 1904 World's Fair memorabilia on auction websites.

History 
In 1855 a group of St. Louisans founded the "St. Louis Agricultural and Mechanical Association," which held annual fairs starting in 1856. Prominent citizens founded the association, which was not intended to pay dividends. All profits were to expand and beautify the fairgrounds.

It was well outside the city limits—an hour's journey from the city by horse-drawn carriage. The largest amphitheater in America was built, seating over 12,000 plus standing room.

The annual fair was an immediate success and soon became noted all over the country. It was, in reality, a gigantic county fair. There were booths for vending wine, beer, and other delicacies. There were displays of livestock, poultry, vegetables, grains, and the latest inventions in farm machinery, tools, household gadgets, etc.

Buildings for the fair included the amphitheater, mechanical hall and agricultural hall. Additional structures were floral hall, the Gothic fine arts hall, and the wire gallinarium, a three-story "Chicken Palace" for displaying poultry. In addition to the exposition halls, a racecourse, grandstand and jockey club were built.

In 1860, the grounds were made available to the public for picnics for a nominal fee, but the Fairs were soon interrupted during the Civil War for a few years, when the fairgrounds were used for military and training purposes.  The large amphitheater was converted into one of the "largest, most thoroughly ventilated hospitals in the United States" accommodating 2,500 patients. Numerous other fairgrounds buildings of the association were taken over for officer's quarters, medical dispensaries, kitchens, and other military purposes. After the war, the park was returned to its former use by the Association.

A zoological garden was added in 1876 modeled after the finest European zoological buildings, and consisting of a monkey house, bear pits, and carnivore house. Later additions were an aviary, outdoor pens for herbivorous animals, a lake and a grotto. These structures and facilities were eventually absorbed by the St. Louis Zoo following its establishment.

In 1902, the first automobile race in St. Louis was held on the grounds.

The last official fair was held in 1902, because preparations were underway for the 1904 World's Fair. Another blow to the fair's revival after 1904 was the abolition of horse racing in Missouri in 1905.

The park transfers to St. Louis 
After protracted political debate, the abandoned  fairgrounds was purchased for park use by St. Louis for $700,000 in 1908, and Fairground Park was dedicated on October 9, 1909. All of the former fair structures and zoo buildings were removed except the bear pits of the old zoo and the amphitheater.

In 1912, the amphitheater was removed and replaced by the city's first municipal swimming pool, then said to be the world's largest. This was replaced by a new pool in 1958 as part of the 1955 bond issue program, which also provided lighted ball diamonds and hard surface tennis courts.

At the corner of Grand and Natural Bridge, the facade of the old bear pits still guards the park's main entrance like a medieval castle and as a reminder of the glory days of the popular St. Louis Exposition.

Notes and references

See also

List of world's fairs
Louisiana Purchase Exposition
Fairground Park

1884 in the United States
Culture of St. Louis
History of St. Louis